The Main Street Bridge formerly carried Main Street over the Rippowam River (also known as Mill River) just outside downtown Stamford, Connecticut. It was designed and manufactured by the Berlin Iron Bridge Company in 1888. The abutments and central pier are cut granite and other stone, faced in concrete.

The bridge was listed on the National Register of Historic Places in 1987, at which time it was the only lenticular truss bridge on a major artery in the state.  The bridge is (as of 2014) only open to pedestrian traffic.

See also
National Register of Historic Places listings in Stamford, Connecticut
List of bridges on the National Register of Historic Places in Connecticut

References

Road bridges on the National Register of Historic Places in Connecticut
Bridges completed in 1888
Bridges in Fairfield County, Connecticut
Buildings and structures in Stamford, Connecticut
National Register of Historic Places in Fairfield County, Connecticut
Wrought iron bridges in the United States